The 1987 Bath City Council election was held on Thursday 7 May 1987 to elect councillors to Bath City Council in England. It took place on the same day as other district council elections in the United Kingdom. One third of seats were up for election. Two seats were contested in Walcot due to an extra vacancy occurring.

Results summary

Ward results
Sitting councillors seeking re-election, elected in 1983, are marked with an asterisk (*). The ward results listed below are based on the changes from the 1986 elections, not taking into account any party defections or by-elections.

Abbey

Bathwick

Bloomfield

Combe Down

Kingsmead

Lambridge

Lansdown

Lyncombe

Newbridge

Oldfield

Southdown

Twerton

Walcot

Westmoreland

Weston

Widcombe

References

1987 English local elections
1987